CTK may refer to:

 C. T. K. Chari (1909–1993), Head of the Department of Philosophy at Madras Christian College from 1958 to 1969
 City Thameslink railway station (station code: CTK), a central London railway station within the City of London
 Crash Test Kitchen, a video cooking podcast and video blog
 CTK – CiTylinK, an airline based in Accra, Ghana
 Czech News Agency, (also ČTK), a national public service news agency in the Czech Republic